M. Ajmal Khan was an Urdu lexicographer and parliamentarian. He was nominated as a member of Rajya Sabha in 1964 and served till 1972.

Sources
Brief Biodata

Nominated members of the Rajya Sabha